The suprascapular notch (or scapular notch) is a notch in the superior border of the scapula, just medial to the base of the coracoid process. It forms the entrance site into the suprascapular canal.

Structure 
This notch is converted into a foramen by the suprascapular ligament, and serves for the passage of the suprascapular nerve; sometimes the ligament is ossified. The suprascapular vessels varies in number as well as in their course as they run at the suprascapular notch site. The suprascapular artery pass above the suprascapular ligament in most cases. The suprascapular vein been found to pass above the suprascapular ligament as well as passing through the suprascapular notch.

Types 
Two main classification systems exists with others being modified approaches of the same principle.

Typing based on subjective observation of the suprascapular notch shape.
There are six basic types of scapular notch:
 Type I: Notch is absent.  The superior border forms a wide depression from the medial angle to the coracoid process.
 Type II: Notch is a blunted V-shape occupying the middle third of the superior border.
 Type III: Notch is U-shaped with nearly parallel margins.
 Type IV: Notch is V-shaped and very small.  A shallow groove is frequently formed for the suprascapular nerve adjacent to the notch.
 Type V: Notch is minimal and U-shaped with a partially ossified ligament.
 Type VI: Notch is a foramen as the ligament is completely ossified.

There are five basic types of scapular notch: 
 Type I: Depth larger than upper width. 
 Type II: Depth equal to upper width.
 Type III: Depth is smaller than upper width.
 Type IV: Notch is a foramen. 
 Type V: Discrete notch.

The second method of suprascapular notch typing yields more practical approach in clinical diagnosis of the suprascapular nerve entrapment.

Clinical Relevance 
As the suprascapular nerve passes through the suprascapular notch, it is a common site of entrapment for the nerve.

Suprascapular notch stenosis is a narrowing of the notch internal space that can potentially compress the suprascapular nerve leading to suprascapular nerve entrapment.  predicted the morphological pattern of the suprascapular notch stenosis revealing higher incidence in the discrete notch (Type V according to the parametric measurements typing system). Two main suprascapular stenosis pattern:
 Vertical stenosis. Treated surgically by cutting the suprascapular ligament (ligamentectomy).
 Horizontal stenosis. Treated surgically by trimming the notch borders (osteoplasty).

The suprascapular nerve predictably passes through the suprascapular notch, so it is a good place for a local nerve block of the entire nerve.

Additional images

See also
 Great scapular notch
 Suprascapular canal

References

 
 
 
 
 

Shoulder
Scapula